Sirgenstein Castle is a ruined castle on rock, over twenty metres high, with a cave inhabited in the Stone Age, the Sirgenstein, between the town of Blaubeuren and hamlet of Schelklingen in Alb-Donau-Kreis in Baden-Württemberg.

The rock castle was probably built in the 13th century. Today its visible remains include castle walls, rusticated ashlar blocks and a neck ditch.

Literature 
 Krahe, Friedrich-Wilhelm:castles in medieval Germany: Plan-lexicon. Würzburg: Verlag Flechsig, 2000.
 Schmitt, Gunter:Sirgenstein. In the same author:Castle Guide Swabian Alb. Volume 2: Alb mid-South. Explore hiking and between Sigmaringen and Ulm. Biberach an der Riss: Biberach printing house, 1989, p. 75-78.
 Uhl, Stefan:CastlesSchelklingen Schelklingen. City Archives, 1991 (Schelklingen books, 18).

See also 
 List of castles in Baden-Württemberg

External links
 Sirgenstein at burgeninventar.de
 Sirgenstein Castle at burgtour.de
 

Ruined castles in Germany